was a Japanese economist.

Beginning in the 1950s, Inada wrote a number of important papers on welfare economics, economic growth and international trade. His contributions include an early extension of Kenneth Arrow's impossibility theorem on the existence of a social welfare function (1955). Inada's extension of the Stolper–Samuelson theorem to the many-good, many-factor case is also considered as a classic piece in trade theory (1971).

Inada has taught at universities including Osaka University and Tokyo Metropolitan University, served as a member of the honorary board of editors for the Japanese Economic Review since its first publishing in 1995, as well as being elected president of the Japanese Economic Association in 1980.

He is known for the Inada conditions on a production function that can guarantee the stability of an economic growth path in a neoclassical growth model.

Selected journal articles
 
 
 
 
 

1925 births
2002 deaths
People from Gunma Prefecture
Japanese economists
University of Tokyo alumni
Academic staff of Tokyo Metropolitan University
Academic staff of Osaka University
Fellows of the Econometric Society
Recipients of the Medal with Purple Ribbon
Recipients of the Order of the Sacred Treasure, 2nd class
Presidents of the Japanese Economic Association